The Horatii and the Curiatii can refer to:

 Horatii and Curiatii, two groups of brothers in ancient Roman legend
 The Horatians and the Curiatians, play by Bertholt Brecht
 Gli Orazi e i Curiazi, opera by Domenico Cimarosa (1796)
 Orazi e Curiazi, opera by  Saverio Mercadante (1846)